Sitapur Junction is a railway junction in the North Eastern Railway zone in Sitapur district, Uttar Pradesh. 
This junction lies on Lucknow-Sitapur-Lakhimpur-Pilibhit-Bareilly-Kasganj Line and Roza-Burhwal Line. Its code is STP. It serves Sitapur city. 
The main line of the Lucknow–Basti–Gorakhpur section is 277 km (172 mi), and also features a branch line which connects to Roza Jn. (Shahjahanpur) from Burhwal Junction with a length of 188 km (117 mi) , and joins to the Lucknow–Moradabad line. The upgraded station now consists of five platforms. Three platforms have been completely renovated to have basic facilities including water and sanitation.

References 

https://indiarailinfo.com/station/blog/267

Railway stations in Sitapur district
Lucknow NER railway division
Sitapur